The Law of the Wild is a 1934 American western serial film produced by Nat Levine, directed by B. Reeves Eason and Armand Schaefer, distributed by  Mascot Pictures, and starring two famous animal stars, Rex the Wonder Horse and Rin Tin Tin Jr. as the serial's two leads. Bob Custer played hero John Sheldon, Richard Cramer played villain Frank Nolan, and famed comedian Ben Turpin co-starred as the comic relief sidekick Henry.

Plot
John Sheldon is falsely accused by Frank Nolan of killing Lou Salters. Nolan steals Sheldon's horse Rex while Sheldon is in jail, with plans to ride him in a big race. Sheldon's friend Alice and her comedic sidekick Henry rescue the horse with the aid of Rin Tin Tin Jr., and Alice rides him in the race instead. The winnings from the race are used to pay for Sheldon's legal defense.

Cast
 Rex King of the Wild Horses as himself
 Rin Tin Tin, Jr. as Rinty
 Bob Custer as John Sheldon 
 Richard Cramer as Frank Nolan, the villain
 Lucile Browne as Alice Ingram
 Ben Turpin as Henry, Alice Ingram's humorous sidekick
 Ernie Adams as Raymond, one of Nolan's henchman
 Edmund Cobb as Jim Luger, one of Nolan's henchman
 Slim Whitaker as Mack, one of Nolan's henchman
 Richard Alexander as Lewis R. 'Lou' Salters, murder victim
 Jack Rockwell as the Sheriff
 George Chesebro as Parks, one of Nolan's henchman

Episodes
 The Man Killer
 The Battle of the Strong
 The Cross-eyed Goony
 Avenging Fangs
 A Dead Man's Hand
 Horse-thief Justice
 The Death Stampede
 The Canyon of Calamity
 Robbers Roost
 King of the Range
 Winner Take All
 The Grand Sweepstakes
Source:

See also
 List of film serials by year
 List of film serials by studio

References

External links

1934 films
American black-and-white films
1930s English-language films
Mascot Pictures film serials
Films directed by B. Reeves Eason
Films directed by Armand Schaefer
Films about horses
Films about dogs
1934 Western (genre) films
Films produced by Nat Levine
American Western (genre) films
Rin Tin Tin
1930s American films